Sanchai Ratiwatana and Sonchat Ratiwatana were the two-time defending champion, and successfully defended their title against Lee Hsin-han and Peng Hsien-yin 6–3, 6–4.

Seeds

Draw

Draw

References
 Main Draw

Shanghai Challenger - Doubles
2013 Doubles